Star Awards 2000 is the eighth installment of the annual Star Awards presented by the Television Corporation of Singapore to honour its artistes who work on Channel 8. The ceremony were hosted by Timothy Chao and Yvette Tsui.

The award ceremony saw numerous changes in the award ceremony, with the Taiwan popularity votes being discontinued and were solely decided by the Malaysia viewers alone, new categories were introduced (such as the Best News/Current Affairs Presenter, now as two separate categories), and nominations for both Primetime and Daytime programs were merged. The ceremony also introduced a new crystal trophy made in Shanghai, designed with a shape of S and A on the angle of view (which represents the initials of Star Awards), and the trophy has been used ever since the ceremony. This was also the last ceremony to be presented under Television Corporation of Singapore before its rebranding to Mediacorp, which would be first used in the next ceremony in 2001.

Winners and nominees 
Winners are listed first, highlighted in boldface.

Professional and Technical Awards were presented before the main ceremony via a clip montage due to time constraints. Unless otherwise stated, the lists of winners are only reflected in the table.

The main awards were presented during the ceremony.

Special Awards

Popularity Awards 

Lee was disqualified midway during the voting period due to contractual violation. She was not replaced and the Top 10 Most Popular Female Artiste went ahead as normal with 19 candidates, while votes cast for her was void and removed from the list of polls on mid-November.

Malaysia polls

References

External links
Star Awards Hall of Fame

Star Awards